The Trade Union of Workers of Metallurgical and Mining Industries of Ukraine (PMGU) is a trade union representing workers in the mining and metalworking industries in Ukraine.

The union was established on 5 September 1990.  It affiliated to the Federation of Trade Unions of Ukraine (FPU).  By 2019, it was the fourth-largest affiliate of the FPU, with 290,000 members.

References

Metal trade unions
Mining trade unions
Trade unions established in 1990
Trade unions in Ukraine